The Udy (also: Uda) is a river that rises in Belgorod Oblast of Russia and runs through Kharkiv Oblast of Ukraine. It is a right tributary of the Siversky Donets near Chuhuiv. The drainage basin occupies . The second largest city of Ukraine, Kharkiv, stands at the confluence of the Udy with the river Lopan.

Physical geography 

The source of the river begins with springs in one of the  beams Central Russian Upland  near the village Bessonovka Belgorodsky District Belgorod Oblast (Russia) at an altitude of 190 m above sea level. The river crosses the border with Russia to the northeast of the village of Okip in Bohodukhiv Raion Kharkiv Oblast. From the source to the confluence of the river Lopan flows from north to south, and below - in a south-easterly direction. The Udy flows into the river Siverskyi Donets 825 km from its mouth. Within the Kharkiv Oblast it flows along Bohodukhiv, Kharkiv,  Chuhuiv raions and through the city of Kharkiv.

The total length of the Udy River is 164 km (127 km within the Kharkiv Oblast). The catchment area is 3894 km2 (in the Kharkiv Oblast 3460 km2). The total height difference (from the source to the mouth is 105 m, the average river slopeis 0.64 m/km.

On the river there are cities  Zolochiv and Kharkiv.

Gallery

References

Rivers of Belgorod Oblast
Rivers of Kharkiv Oblast